The 1910 Harvard Crimson football team was an American football team that represented Harvard University as an independent during the 1910 college football season. In its third year under head coach Percy Haughton, the Crimson compiled an 8–0–1 record, shut out seven of eight opponents, and outscored all opponents by a total of 155 to 5.

There was no contemporaneous system in 1910 for determining a national champion. However, Harvard was retroactively named as the national champion by the Billingsley Report, Helms Athletic Foundation, and Houlgate System, and as a co-national champion by the National Championship Foundation. 

Three Harvard players were consensus first-team selections on the 1910 All-American football team: halfback Percy Wendell, guard Bob Fisher, and tackle Robert McKay. Other notable players included fullback/halfback Hamilton Corbett (chosen as All-American by Wilton S. Farnsworth of the New York Evening Journal), ends Lawrence Dunlap Smith and Richard Plimpton Lewis, tackle Lothrop "Ted" Withington, and guard Wayland Minot (chosen as first-team All-American by The New York Times).

Schedule

References

Harvard
Harvard Crimson football seasons
College football national champions
College football undefeated seasons
Harvard Crimson football
1910s in Boston